Legacy West is a business and cultural district, a lifestyle center in Plano, Texas, bordered on the south by the curving Legacy Drive and Headquarters Drive, on the north by the Sam Rayburn Tollway, on the east by the Dallas North Tollway, and on the west by the exit to Headquarters Drive from Sam Rayburn Tollway. It includes 415,000 square feet of retail, restaurant and office space, a 55,000 square-foot food hall, over 1,300 residential units and a 303-room Renaissance Hotel.

Development
In late 2011, JCPenney issued a request for proposals to develop the 240 acres of land surrounding its regional headquarters in Plano. The surrounding property had been vacant since JCPenney purchased the land in 1987, to relocate its headquarters to Texas from New York City. In 2014, JCPenney came to an agreement with local real estate firms Karahan Companies, KDC and Columbus Realty Partners to develop the land. Construction started later that year, with the developers planning a luxury hotel tower, corporate office space, urban shopping center and apartments. When Toyota announced soon after that it would be moving its North American headquarters to the site from Torrance, California, developers pushed up the timetable for the project.

Toyota broke ground to begin construction on its new $350 million 100-acre headquarters in January 2015. The following month, developers broke ground on the first phase of Legacy West's $2 billion mixed-use project. Construction continued over the next two years on corporate offices, residential, retail, and restaurant properties. On June 2, 2017, Legacy West officially opened the shopping district to the public. Secretary of State of Texas Rolando Pablos, Plano Mayor Harry LaRosiliere and developer Fehmi Karahan helped cut the ceremonial ribbon for the grand opening.

In late 2017 construction continued on projects anchoring the northern end of the retail and entertainment district, including Legacy Hall, a three-story food hall that will have more than two-dozen stalls featuring food concepts from restaurateurs including Dallas-based chef John Tesar and Chili's founder Larry Lavine. Legacy Hall will also house a brewery and tap room from Unlawful Assembly Brewing Company.

Shops, hotel and tenants

All of the restaurants and retailers are located on tree-lined Windrose Avenue, which spans from Sam Rayburn Tollway to Legacy Drive, where it ends at the Beal Bank corporate office. Shops include Suitsupply, Coach, Bonobos, Fabletics, a Tesla showroom, Warby Parker, Levi's, MAC Cosmetics, J.Crew, Sephora, Tumi, Filson, Peter Millar and West Elm. There is also a Barnes & Noble concept store with a restaurant serving wine and beer and a Tommy Bahama Island store and restaurant, in addition to Del Frisco's Double Eagle Steak House, Shake Shack, True Food Kitchen, Taverna and Starbucks Reserve. At the center of the development is a 3,500 square-foot Bellagio-inspired fountain where choreographed water, light and music shows take place.

Legacy West is home to the headquarters of JCPenney,
FedEx Office, NTT Data Systems, and Fogo de Chão and the North American headquarters for Toyota Motor Corporation, and the regional headquarters for JPMorgan Chase, and Liberty Mutual Insurance. It also includes the 15-story, 303-room Renaissance Dallas at Plano Legacy West Hotel.

The Shops at Legacy
To the east of Legacy West and Dallas North Tollway is the Shops at Legacy, a 400,000 square ft lifestyle center. It is located south of the corporate headquarters of Alliance Data and LegacyTexas Bank. The Shops at Legacy has a luxury Marriot hotel called the Dallas/Plano Marriott at Legacy Town Center just south of Legacy Drive, overlooking Bishop Park and houses Hilti North America, Hilti's North American headquarters. Right in the center of The Shops at Legacy is the Baccus Cemetery, the oldest cemetery in Plano dating back to about 1847 where Captain Henry Cook buried his son Daniel Cook, a veteran from the War of 1812. The Baccus Cemetery is one of the most historic sites in Plano.

Shops include Benefit Cosmetics, bluemercury, Elaine Turner, Kendra Scott, lululemon athletica, Urban Outfitters, Louis Vuitton, Gucci, and Tiffany and Co.

See also
 Plano, Texas
 List of shopping malls in Texas

References

External links
 Official website

2017 establishments in Texas
Buildings and structures in Plano, Texas
Tourist attractions in Texas
Shopping malls in the Dallas–Fort Worth metroplex
Central business districts in the United States